The Leeds Club is a Grade II* listed Victorian building in Leeds, West Yorkshire, England. It is situated on Albion Place in the city centre.  

Built in 1820 as residences for the son and grandson of William Hey, a distinguished surgeon, the building was converted into the Leeds Club, a place where the city's leaders could meet, in 1849 and given a new facade. Renovations were completed in 2007, and the building is now used for conferences, weddings and Christmas parties.

The Historic England listing record describes the building as having "fine and very complete nineteenth century interior decoration" and draws attention to the "very fine" men's lavatory in the basement with "coloured marble sinks with completely original fittings".

See also
Grade II* listed buildings in Leeds
Listed buildings in Leeds (City and Hunslet Ward - northern area)

References

External links

Listed buildings in Leeds
Grade II* listed buildings in West Yorkshire
Houses completed in 1820
Grade II* listed houses
Houses in West Yorkshire
Leeds Blue Plaques